Hojjatabad (also Romanized as Ḩojjatābād) is a village in Javid-e Mahuri Rural District, in the Central District of Mamasani County, Fars Province, Iran. At the 2006 census, its population was 191, in 46 families.

References 

Populated places in Mamasani County